Schlittschuhclub Reinach or SC Reinach, nicknamed 'The Lions', is a Swiss ice hockey club in the Women's League, previously known as the SWHL A and LKA/LNA. The team was founded in 1989 and gained promotion to the top flight of women's ice hockey in Switzerland in the late 1990s. They play in Reinach, Canton of Aargau at Kunsteisbahn Oberwynental. 

The club also has a men‘s team in the 3. Liga and an active youth section.

History   

In 1997, the club shortened their name from SC Reinach Albatros to SC Reinach.

The club won the Swiss Championship three years in row from 2001 to 2003. From 2013 to 2017, the club struggled, being forced to compete in the relegation playoffs three times in four years. In 2018, the club signed a development agreement with second tier club SC Langenthal. 

The team was bolstered by several major signings for the 2017–18 season, including Julia Marty, Rahel Enzler, and Darcia Leimgruber, and the team markedly improved, finishing fourth in the league for the regular season. After further adding Evelina Raselli and Noemi Ryhner ahead of the 2018–19 season, SC Reinach ranked second in the regular season.

Notable alumna    
Florence Schelling, 2013–2015
Mariko Dale, 2010–2013 & 2016–2019 
Daniela Diaz, 2001–02
Rahel Enzler, 2017–2020
Evelina Raselli, 2018–2020
Noemi Ryhner, 2017–2020 
Lara Stalder, 2009–2012
Riitta Schäublin, 2000–01
Anja Stiefel, 2009–2013

International players 

  Denise Altmann, 2005–06
 Dana Antal, 1997–98
 Petra Daňková, 2013–14
 Ingvild Farstad, 2014–15
 Kateřina Flachsová, 2015–16
 Sanna Lankosaari, 2003–04
 Michaela Matejová, 2009–10
 Petra Pravlíková, 2013–14
 Sara Seiler, 2005–06
  Simona Studentová, 2015–16
  Angela Taylor, 2010–11
 Martina Veličková, 2013–14

References

External links 
SC Reinach Official Site 

Ice hockey teams in Switzerland
Women's ice hockey teams in Europe

Swiss Women's League teams
Women's ice hockey in Switzerland